Sanam Re is a 2016 Indian Hindi-language romantic drama film directed by Divya Khosla Kumar and produced by Bhushan Kumar, Krishan Kumar and co-produced by Ajay Kapoor. The film stars Pulkit Samrat, Yami Gautam and Urvashi Rautela, while Rishi Kapoor appears in a crucial supporting role.

It is widely panned by critics and audience alike.

Plot
The story begins just before the beginning of a new year. Akash works for a private firm in Mumbai and leads a monotonous life. When he learns that his grandfather's health has worsened, he leaves the city to visit his native town, Tanakpur. There, he negotiates a deal to sell his grandfather's studio. While visiting the studio for one last time, he is driven into nostalgia, and the story is sent in a flashback. 
Six-year-old Akash lives with his parents and grandfather, who is a photographer. Akash's grandfather predicts that Akash will fall in love with a girl who lives 500 steps away from their studio and that they will be in love forever but won't be able to live together. Akash takes 500 steps and finds a girl older than him, disappointing him. Meanwhile, when he gets to high-school, he falls for Shruti. But he left her without informing just because he had to continue his higher studies in Mumbai. When Shruti learns this, she is shattered. She couldn't accept his selfishness after a long-term, affectionate relationship. 
Back in the present, He tries to find Shruti but fails. When he learns that his boss has fired him, he rushes back and is asked to secure a big contract for his company if he wants to save his job. He travels to Canada to meet Mrs. Pablo, their company investor's wife who is now broken-up with her husband. He attends a yoga camp, where he becomes friends with Mrs. Pablo and learns that her real name is Akansha. Akash also meets Shruti there, who behaves like a happy-go-lucky and doesn't recognize Akash. Akash pretends to be in love with Akansha to secure the contract, but he and Shruti fall in love with each other again during completing a task in the camp. They sleep together and revive their lost love. It is also revealed that Akansha is none other than the tall girl that Akash met in his childhood. Akash is again left heartbroken when Shruti leaves at the end of the camp, saying that they can't be together.

Akash realizes Shruti still loves him and embarks on a journey to find the truth behind her rejection with the help of Akansha. He learns that she left him because she is suffering from a rare heart disease; she will die if her heart isn't transplanted soon. She requests him to live with her, all the life they would have if they were given a chance. In just a few days, they experience the life of being newly married, being a wedded couples and growing old. By the time they finish experiencing those days, they have a sweet and emotional conversation, and now Akash has to leave for his job purpose.

A few months later, Shruti moves out of the hospital, healthy and cured-they found a donor and the transplant was done. In order to be with Akash, she moves to the city to find him and is left shocked when his phone is switched off and she can't contact him. Hopelessly, she wanders around until she finds a voice note left by Akash, then further goes in search for him. In the end, when she passes nearby her own house, her heart begins to beat faster. That's when she realizes that Akash was the one who gave his heart to her for the transplant, because Akash's heart always beat faster when he passed through Shruti's house as he loved her a lot. Thus, Shruti realizes that Akash is dead and cries a lot in the memory of Akash. Then she goes on to open the studio of Akash's grandfather and hangs the wood where "Aakash loves Shruti" was written by both of them during their childhood. The film ends with a snap of Akash's grandfather, taken by Shruti, in their studio.

Cast
 Pulkit Samrat as Akash / Bill
 Yami Gautam as Shruti / Anjali
 Urvashi Rautela as Akansha / Mrs. Pablo
 Rishi Kapoor as Akash's Grandfather/Daddu
 Aashish Kaul as Akash's Father
 Prachi Shah as Akash's Mom
 Bharti Singh as Babyji
 Ketki Dave as Visitor's Wife
 Jiten Mukhi as Visitor
 Manoj Joshi as Akash's Boss
Ankit Arora as Doc
Muna Ali (cameo appearance)
 Divya Khosla Kumar as an item girl in songs "Humne Pee Rakhi Hai" and "Akkad Bakkad" (cameo appearance)
 Jaz Dhami as Singer in the song "Humne Pee Rakhi Hai" (cameo appearance)

Production
The film began production in December 2014, in Barog station Shimla. Sanam Re was shot in multiple locations like Mumbai, Chandigarh , Shimla, Kalpa and Ladakh, Banff, Jasper, Waterton Park, Tanakpur and Calgary, Canada.

Soundtrack

The music for Sanam Re was composed by Mithoon, Jeet Gannguli, Amaal Mallik, and Epic Bhangra. Raju Singh composed the original background score. The lyrics were penned by Rashmi Virag, Mithoon, Manoj Muntashir, Manoj Yadav, Ikka Singh and Kumaar. The film's title track, "Sanam Re" featuring the vocals of Arijit Singh, was released as a single on 22 December 2015. The second song, titled "Gazab Ka Hai Yeh Din" was released on 1 January 2016. One song, "Kya Tujhe Ab Ye Dil Bataye" was sung by Pakistani pop singer Falak Shabir. The soundtrack was released on 4 January 2016 by T-Series.

Three songs were released later and were not the part of the film's album. The female version of title track was released in the voice of Tulsi Kumar and Mithoon and latter on Falak Shabir and T-Series released Kya Tujhe Ab Ye Dil Bataye in Unplugged & Sad Version on 4 February 2016. The additional rap song by Badshah titled "Akkad Bakkad", was released on 8 February 2016 to celebrate the music of the film.

Box office
The movie collected $1.4 million on its first day at the box-office. The movie remained stable over the weekend and collected $1.75 million. On its opening week it net grossed $1.4 million. The movie then had a lifetime of $3.83 million.

References

External links
 
 

2010s Hindi-language films
Indian romantic musical films
2016 films
Films shot in Uttarakhand
T-Series (company) films
Films scored by Jeet Ganguly
Films scored by Amaal Mallik
Films scored by Mithoon
Films shot in Calgary
Indian romantic drama films
2016 romantic drama films
2010s romantic musical films